Hassiba is a Syrian drama film by director Raymond Boutros. The film is set in 1930s Damascus and tackles social and political issues to the backdrop of the French mandate of Syria.

External links
 

2008 films
2000s Arabic-language films
Films directed by Raymond Boutros
Syrian drama films